Genetrix may refer to:
Genetrix, novel by Francois Mauriac
Project Genetrix
the biotechnology company Genetrix, acquired by Genzyme in 1996 and now a part of Sanofi through its acquisition of Genzyme

See also 

 Venus Genetrix (disambiguation)